Domenica Ruta is an American author. Her first book, the memoir With or Without You, was a New York Times Best Seller.

Early life
Ruta was born in Danvers, Massachusetts to unwed teenage parents. She attended Phillips Academy and Oberlin College. Ruta holds a Master of Fine Arts from the Michener Center for Writers at the University of Texas at Austin.

Career
Ruta's memoir, With or Without You, was published on February 26, 2013. It chronicles Ruta's difficult relationship with her drug-addicted mother, as well as Ruta's own struggle with alcoholism.

She currently teaches memoir writing and creative nonfiction for Gotham Writers Workshop in New York City.

References

Writers from Massachusetts
21st-century American memoirists
Phillips Academy alumni
Oberlin College alumni
Michener Center for Writers alumni
Living people
American women memoirists
21st-century American women writers
Year of birth missing (living people)